Polybia dimidiata, also known as the tapiucaba or lamborina in Brazil, is a species of eusocial wasp found in South America.

References

Vespidae
Hymenoptera of South America
Hymenoptera of Brazil
Insects described in 1791